African Youth Amílcar Cabral is the youth wing of PAIGC in Guinea-Bissau. JAAC was founded on September 12, 1974, in Boé.

After the separation of PAICV from PAIGC, the Cape Verdean section of JAAC became a separate organization, also called JAAC. Today that organization has been renamed Youth of PAICV (Juventude do PAICV).

JAAC is a member of World Federation of Democratic Youth, although it is no longer active in that organization. It used to be a member of the International Union of Students, but the membership is currently frozen. JAAC has obtained observer status in the International Union of Socialist Youth.

Youth wings of political parties in Guinea-Bissau
1974 establishments in Guinea-Bissau
Youth organizations established in 1974